Vasiliy Egorovich Tairov (or Vasyl or Vasil; 1859-1938) was a Soviet and Armenian viticulturist and scientist. After studying winemaking in France, he and his cousin Nerses Tairan opened the first brandy factory in Armenia. Tairov founded the Winemaking Bulletin, a journal, in Odessa, Ukraine in 1892. In 1905, he founded what would become the V.Ye. Tairov Institute of Viticulture and Winemaking. It was the first scientific winemaking institution in Odessa. A memorial in his honor was erected in Odessa to celebrate his 185th birthday.

References

External links 
 

Viticulturists
1859 births

1938 deaths
Place of birth missing